Aethaloessa is a genus of moths of the family Crambidae.

Species
Aethaloessa calidalis (Guenée, 1854)
Aethaloessa floridalis (Zeller, 1852)
Aethaloessa rufula Whalley, 1961

References

Spilomelinae
Crambidae genera
Taxa named by Julius Lederer